Jupiter LI, provisionally known as , is a natural satellite of Jupiter. It was discovered by R. Jacobson, M. Brozović, B. Gladman, and M. Alexandersen in 2010. It received its permanent number in March 2015. It is now known to circle Jupiter at an average distance of 23.45 million km, taking 2.02 years to complete an orbit around Jupiter. Jupiter LI is about 3 km wide. It is a member of the Carme group.

This body was discovered from the 200-inch (508 cm) aperture Hale telescope in California. (there is also a 60-inch aperture Hale telescope)

References

Moons of Jupiter
Irregular satellites
20100907
Carme group
Moons with a retrograde orbit
Discoveries by Brett J. Gladman